Henry William Bentinck (15 November 1765–10 November 1820) was a Dutch-born military officer, planter and colonial administrator. He served as Governor of Saint Vincent (1802–1806), Essequibo Demerara (1806–1812), and Berbice (1814–1820).

Biography
Bentinck was born in The Hague, Dutch Republic on 15 November 1765 as Hendrik Willem Bentinck. He was a grandson of Willem Bentinck van Rhoon, and a relative of William Cavendish-Bentinck, 3rd Duke of Portland. Bentinck was educated in Great-Britain. He served 12 years in the cavalry of William V, Prince of Orange. On 18 January 1795, William V fled from the Netherlands, and went into exile in Great-Britain. In the same year, Bentinck left for Great-Britain, and started to work for the British colonial service. 

In 1802, he was appointed Governor of Saint Vincent and served until 1806. After returning from England, he was appointed Governor of Demerara and Essequibo on 10 May 1806. The British government issued a rule overturning the Demerara Court of Policy's decision to proscribe slaves from holding meetings at night. Bentinck delayed implementing the rule, and was dismissed as a result. In April 1812, he returned to England and was succeeded by Hugh Lyle Carmichael. On 8 January 1814, Bentinck served as Governor of Berbice. In Berbice, he was also owner of plantation "La Bonne Intention". He was involved in cotton, but ran into financial difficulties.

On 10 November 1820, Bentinck died in Georgetown, at the age of 54.

References

|-

|-

|-

1765 births
1820 deaths
Politicians from The Hague
Governors of British Saint Vincent and the Grenadines
Governors of Demerara
Governors of Berbice
Governors of Essequibo
Dutch slave owners
18th-century Dutch military personnel
Henry William Bentinck